Castle Hill Public School is a primary, co-educational school in Castle Hill, northwestern suburb of Sydney. It serves 780 students, from kindergarten to year six, and was established in 1879.
Its school colours are navy and red. The principal is Craig Oliver.

History
The school's origins are from 12 July 1880 when St Paul's Denominational School was closed and the 64 students marched 800 metres to the new school site. The original Gothic school building and vested residence was designed by George Allen Mansfield and built by George Coates & Son in 1878. This building, still standing, and is today subject to a heritage conservation order.

Lessons commenced on 12 July 1880. At the time, Castle Hill was a rural community and the original building comprising a single classroom and a teacher residence provided for 64 students.

The school continued to grow in numbers and by the early 1980s was the largest public school in the New South Wales with over 1000 students. As the school and its community grew, additional land was acquired and buildings added.

In the late 1980s, 1,600 students were enrolled but with the building of other schools nearby, the student population has settled at around 800.

On 18 October 1998, the school moved to a new site, that was a former University of Sydney research centre, with the former school ground sold to Queensland Investment Corp for the expansion of Castle Towers shopping centre. The school continues on this new site.
Building started mid-1997 and the new Castle Hill Public School was completed in October 1998.

Principals
 John Ussher  	        1 July 1880
 John J. Carolan     	10 February 1888  
 Robert S. McCormick     21 December 1894
 Thomas E. Cambourn      19 March 1902
 William H. Johnston    	28 February 1910
 Henry R. Anstey         14 May 1919
 Robert M. Ross 	        27 March 1930
 Arthur E. Cattell      5 December 1939
 Edward J. Stanley       4 December 1942
 George Redmond          30 January 1950
 William N. Walker      	1 February 1955
 Hilton O. Bloomfield 	30 January 1962
 John G. Gallagher       28 January 1969
 Leslie J. N. Shore 	27 January 1976
 Peter Shuttleworth 	21 April 1992
 Bryan Mullan 	27 January 1998
 Steve Connelly 21 January 2013
 Craig Oliver 2015–present

References

Public primary schools in Sydney
Castle Hill, New South Wales
Educational institutions established in 1880
1880 establishments in Australia